Placidina is a genus of clearwing (ithomiine) butterflies, named by d'Almeida in 1928. They are in the brush-footed butterfly family, Nymphalidae. It is a monotypic genus, containing only Placidina euryanassa described by father-and-son entomologists Cajetan and Rudolf Felder in 1860.

References 

Ithomiini
Nymphalidae of South America
Nymphalidae genera